People for the Ethical Treatment of Animals (PETA), an animal rights organization based in the United States, has released a number of browser games on its website that have parodied existing video games. Various PETA parodies have been made based on games such as New Super Mario Bros., Cooking Mama 2: World Kitchen, New Super Mario Bros. Wii, Super Meat Boy, Super Mario 3D Land, Pokémon Black 2 and White 2, and Pokémon X and Y. PETA creates these games to spread attention about real-life animal rights and animal welfare concerns and to advocate for vegetarian and vegan diets.

History

Some of PETA's earliest forays into gaming include Flash-based games such as Make Fred Spew (2001) and Save the Chicks (2003), which were included as part of PETA's anti-dairy and Kentucky Fried Cruelty campaigns. These games received some coverage in academic and news sources, and PETA's head of online marketing, Joel Bartlett, identified their 2004 Revenge of the PETA Tomatoes and the Frogger parody, Lobster Liberation, as some of the organization's earliest released games. However it was not until 2007 that PETA began to attract wider attention within the gaming community with its release of Super Chick Sisters, a parody of New Super Mario Bros. and Super Mario Galaxy. Controlling two female chicks named Nugget and Chickette, the player sets out to rescue vegetarian actress Pamela Anderson, who has publicly revealed animal cruelty endemic to KFC's food production, from KFC's mascot Colonel Sanders. In 2009, the game was met with a sequel, New Super Chick Sisters, a homage to New Super Mario Bros. Wii In this game, McDonald's mascot Ronald McDonald kidnaps Anderson with the intent of using her as a Happy Meal ingredient, and the Chick Sisters must rescue her again.

In 2008, PETA released an adaptation of the cooking simulator Cooking Mama 2: World Kitchen called Cooking Mama: Mama Kills Animals. In it, PETA encouraged users to write to Cooking Mama developer Majesco Entertainment to create a version of the game with only vegetarian recipes. Mama Kills Animals consists of minigames related to the preparation of animal carcasses, in this case, a stuffed turkey. After successfully completing the main levels, Mama goes vegan and hugs a live turkey, while the player makes a tofurkey. The game contains facts about turkeys and includes vegan Thanksgiving recipes.

Edmund McMillen from Team Meat, the developer of the indie game Super Meat Boy, created various accounts on PETA's official forums to try to get his game parodied by PETA. PETA developed Super Tofu Boy and released it in December 2010. It stars Tofu Boy, an anthropomorphic cube of tofu whose goal is to rescue Bandage Girl, the girlfriend of the original game's protagonist Meat Boy, from Meat Boy. It plays as a standard platformer and is peppered with inter-level pro-vegetarian messages and facts about meat consumption and the livestock industry. However, Team Meat, the developers of Super Meat Boy, fought back by adding Tofu Boy as a playable character in the PC version of the game. Tofu Boy is unlocked by typing the word “petaphile” in the character selection screen. As a playable character, he is very slow and has horrible jumps, but players would always get a Grade A+ regardless of how long it took to finish a level, and is needed to get a Trophy on the Steam version called "Well look at you!". He would eventually return in the sequel, Super Meat Boy Forever and works exactly the same as the first game, except this time, he occasionally stops running to take a breather and can be unlocked after you play a level as him after getting 60 Pacifiers, but was needed for another Trophy called "For the vegans". This is potentially because PETA didn’t understand that the “meat” in Meat Boy’s name isn’t meant to encourage people to eat meat, it is supposed to represent his sensitive side, since he has no skin.

After releasing Mario Kills Tanooki, a parody of Super Mario 3D Land, PETA released a statement that "Tanooki May Be Just As 'Suit' in Mario Games. But in Real Life, Tanooki Are Raccoon Dogs Who is Skinned Alive for Their Fur." The organization also stated that "by wearing Tanooki, Mario is sending the message that it's OK to wear fur." It is an action game in which the player controls a skinned but living raccoon dog that chases Mario to retrieve its fur.

PETA took on the Pokémon series with Pokémon Black and Blue, a parody of Pokémon Black and White 2 that focuses on animal fighting and experimentation. In role-playing-style battles, the player controls a Pikachu who escapes Ash Ketchum’s abusive circus. Pikachu first fights a drunk Cheren, who brutally abuses his Tepig in a dog fighting-esque manner, and then moves on to other Trainers and characters in order to rescue their Pokémon from their ownership (a Snivy being experimented on by Professor Juniper, an Oshawott skinned alive by Ghetsis, and finally Ash himself). Pikachu recruits these Pokémon to its cause, as well as the sympathetic Nurse Joy. A sequel, Pokémon Red, White, and Blue, A parody of Pokémon X and Y, Is followed in 2013. The game suggests that Nintendo's continual releases of X and Y reduces humans' empathy for animals. Also a role-playing game, it stars Pikachu and Miltank, who battle McDonald's characters like the Hamburglar in a crusade against the rare but ongoing practice of meat production in the Unova region instead of Kalos. Pikachu must rescue a Jigglypuff from being treated like furniture, a Miltank from the dairy industry and the slaughterhouse, and Grimace from being tortured. At the beginning of the game, Pikachu is nearly eaten by an obese gamer but lives.

Also in 2013, PETA released Cage Fight: Knock Out Animal Abuse, a beat 'em up game in the style of River City Ransom. The player controls vegetarian mixed martial arts fighters Jake Shields, Aaron Simpson, and Georgi Karakhanyan and attacks animal testing practitioners to rescue confined animals. There is a warning before the game begins that it is illegal to punch scientists in real life.

PETA has parodied Fast Food Nation in a game called “You Want Lies With That?”. The player controls an evil chef who must create hamburgers while avoiding the pigs and cows who are chasing him. Successful completion of each level reveals the links between meat consumption and heart attacks or E. coli.

There is also a hunting game where the player shoots tofu deer; “Stick a Chick”, where the player must prevent salmonella-infected chicken from entering the shopping cart; an animal testing awareness game that also spreads awareness about breast cancer; a gory maze game about seal clubbing; several games about animal skins used in fashion; and a quiz game that compares the American Kennel Club to the KKK.

Reception and impact
PETA's games have received mainly negative opinions from video game journalists. Forbes contributor Erik Kain summarized the series in general as "a long parade of silly protests." He also considered PETA's failure to satirize well-known hunting games like Duck Hunt and Big Game Hunter as well as the general message that video games encourage real-life violence, to be illogical.

Response to Mario Kills Tanooki has been negative, generally holding that it was under-researched. While PETA's protest focused on Mario wearing a raccoon dog's skin rather than harming them himself, Gaming Union stated that "from any gamers' perspective, it's clear to see that PETA have missed their mark on this one; Mario squishes hundreds of enemies in each of his games, but is never seen harming a tanuki." Kain called the game "ludicrous" given that gamers had long adored the Tanooki suit and would not be encouraged to kill real-life raccoon dogs.

Jessica Conditt from Joystiq found the messages of Pokémon Black and Blue to be contradictory: "while it's terrible to punch, kick, cut or hit fictional animals with bats, it's perfectly acceptable to electrocute humans". Jason Schreier from Kotaku called it "ridiculous". Kotaku's Mike Fahey wrote a mostly negative piece about Pokémon Red, White, and Blue; he stated that despite its occasional humor, "mostly it just wanders about, beating its message into your brain with heavy hands."

Not all critical response has been unfavorable. Fahey opined that New Super Chick Sisters "manages to be a rather capable little platformer despite its heavy-handed message." Nikole Zivalich of G4TV called Super Tofu Boy "actually a pretty good time waster" and, as she is a vegetarian, claimed to be "on Team Tofu." Overall, Mike Splechta from GameZone stated that "some are a little less flattering than others, but they do tend to get their point across." He also called Cage Fight "kickass", praising its gameplay and chiptune soundtrack, and encouraged readers to play it.

In some cases, the creators of the original games have responded to PETA's parodies. In response to Super Tofu Boy, Super Meat Boy developer Team Meat added Tofu Boy as a playable character in a Super Meat Boy update. Majesco responded to Cooking Mama: Mama Kills Animals that the Mama character, while not a vegetarian herself, supports treating animals humanely and "would never put rat in [her] Ratatouille." Nintendo also released a statement in regards to Pokémon Black & Blue stating, "Nintendo and the Pokémon company take the inappropriate use of our products and intellectual property seriously."

Notable titles
PETA's games—and the games they parody—that have received press coverage include:
Super Chick Sisters (2007) – New Super Mario Bros. and Super Mario Galaxy
Cooking Mama: Mama Kills Animals (2008) – Cooking Mama: World Kitchen
New Super Chick Sisters (2009) – New Super Mario Bros. Wii
Super Tofu Boy (2010) – Super Meat Boy
Mario Kills Tanooki (2011) – Super Mario 3D Land
Pokémon Black and Blue (2012) – Pokémon Black and White 2
Cage Fight: Knock Out Animal Abuse (2013) – River City Ransom
Pokémon Red, White, and Blue: An Unofficial PETA Parody (2013) – Pokémon X and Y

References

External links

 Full list of PETA's browser games

Action video games
Animal rights mass media
Beat 'em ups
Browser games
Cooking video games
Flash games
Parody video games
People for the Ethical Treatment of Animals
Platform games
Role-playing video games
Simulation video games
Vegetarian-related mass media
Video games scored by Tommy Tallarico
Video games developed in the United States
Satirical video games